Zeandale is an unincorporated community in Riley County, Kansas, United States. As of the 2020 census, the population of the community and nearby areas was 62.

History
Zeandale was named by J.H. Pillsbury who settled the township in 1855. The name is said to have been taken from the Greek, zea meaning "corn" and the English, dale.  Zeandale had a post office between 1857 and 1944.

It is also home to Zeandale Community Church, established in 1896.  The church was originally associated with the Stone-Campbell Restoration movement (Christian Church), but was re-established in the 1950s as a non-denominational community church.

The community has a rural, volunteer fire department, updated in 2002 with a new building.

Zeandale is home to two 4-H clubs and the Zeandale Community Church. The Zeandale 4-H club meets in the former Zeandale High School, turned community building, and the Pillsbury 4-H club meets in the Pillsbury School one mile south.

Zeandale almost grew by a factor of four in 2005, when a Manhattan developer cited land for sale surrounding Zeandale as prime real-estate for the growing Manhattan market. However, Riley County zoning regulations prevented the subdivision, and inevitable incorporation.

Geography

Demographics

For statistical purposes, the United States Census Bureau has defined Zeandale as a census-designated place (CDP).

Zeandale is part of the Manhattan Metropolitan Statistical Area.

Education
The community is served by Wamego USD 320 public school district.

References

Further reading

External links
 Riley County maps: Current, Historic, KDOT

Unincorporated communities in Kansas
Unincorporated communities in Riley County, Kansas
Manhattan, Kansas metropolitan area